Mario Gomez was the mayor of Huntington Park, California from 2009 until 2011.

Gomez was elected to the Huntington Park City Council in 2003 and was re-elected in 2007. On March 23, 2009, he was appointed to a 2-year term as mayor by the 5-member City Council succeeding Elba Guerrero. The Los Angeles Wave reported in 2011 that Gomez "operates a paint store, served as vice mayor the past year and was promoted to the mayor’s chair by his colleagues at the reorganization meeting March 23." His term ended in March 2011.

References

Living people
Mayors of places in California
People from Huntington Park, California
Year of birth missing (living people)